A toko (Indonesian for shop) is a kind of retail shop in Indonesia and the Netherlands. The term is of Indonesian origin and probably from the Chinese Hokkien loanword to refer a shop. In Indonesia, the term toko is used a generic name for any kind of established shop or store. For example, in Indonesia, toko roti means a bakery while a toko kelontong sells daily necessities. In the Netherlands, the meaning has shifted more specifically to refer to Asian shops and takeaway restaurants, which sells mainly Asian food products of which the owners are generally Indo-European, Native Indonesian, Surinamese, Chinese or Vietnamese.

History
Tokos as a place of commerce emerged in present-day Indonesia during the Dutch East Indies era, where many shophouse (rumah toko in Indonesian) ran by local Chinese seller in major cities such as Batavia.  

Tokos have become a common type of shop in Dutch cities since the repatriation of Dutch colonial expats and Indo-Europeans during and after the Indonesian revolution in the late 1940s and early 1950s. Tokos originally sold products from the former Dutch East Indies (now Indonesia).  

In the Dutch language the word toko has become an informal name for any type of company or organisation.

Indonesian e-commerce company Tokopedia takes its name from combining toko with an encyclopedia.

See also 
 Asian supermarket
 Warung, another smaller kind of eatery or shop in Indonesia
 Sari-sari store, a type of small variety store in the Philippines

References

Food retailers
Retailing in the Netherlands
Retailing in Indonesia